William Clarence Stokoe Jr. (July 21, 1919 – April 4, 2000) was an American linguist and a long-time professor at Gallaudet University. His research on American Sign Language (ASL) revolutionized the understanding of ASL in the United States and sign languages throughout the world. Stokoe's work led to a widespread recognition that sign languages are true languages, exhibiting syntax and morphology, and are not only systems of gesture.

Early life and education 
William C. Stokoe Jr. was born July 21, 1919, in Lancaster, New Hampshire. Stokoe graduated from Cornell University in 1941, from which he earned his Ph.D. in English in 1946, specializing in medieval literature. From there, he became an instructor of English at Wells College.

Career

From 1955 to 1970, he served as a professor and chairman of the English department at Gallaudet University, after being recruited to the position by his friend and former classmate Dean George Detmold. He published Sign Language Structure (1960) and co-authored along with Dorothy C. Casterline and Carl G. Croneberg, A Dictionary of American Sign Language on Linguistic Principles (1965). The former was the first place the term "American sign language" was ever formally used. (The fully capitalized version: "American Sign Language," first appeared in the Buff and Blue in October 1963.) He also started the academic journal Sign Language Studies in 1972, which he edited until 1996. He established Linstok Press, an academic publishing company, to facilitate the journal's publication. Stokoe's final book, Language in Hand, was published in 2001, after his death.

Though the relationship between Stokoe and Gallaudet was not always one of complete support (Gallaudet closed his Linguistics Research Laboratory, wherein he carried out the studies that would lead him to declare ASL a fully formed and legitimate language, in 1984, after he retired), the university awarded him an honorary doctorate in 1988.

Sign language research

Stokoe researched American Sign Language (ASL) extensively while he worked at Gallaudet University. He coined the term cherology, the equivalent of phonology for sign language. However, sign language linguists, of which he was the first, now generally use the term "phonology" for signed languages.

Notation system

Stokoe invented a written notation for sign language (now called Stokoe notation) as ASL had no written form at the time. Unlike SignWriting, which was developed later, it is not pictographic, but drew heavily on the Latin alphabet.

Thus the written form of the sign for 'mother' looks like 
 ͜ 5x  
The ' ͜ ' indicates that it is signed at the chin, the '5' that it uses a spread hand (the '5' of ASL), and the 'x' that the thumb touches the chin. Stokoe coined the terms tab, dez, and sig, meaning sign location, handshape and motion, to indicate different categories of phonemes in ASL. The Stokoe notation system has been used for other sign languages, but is mostly restricted to linguists and academics (as yet, no notation system for a sign language has gained significant use).

Legacy

Through the publication of his work, he was instrumental in changing the perception of ASL from that of a broken or simplified version of English to that of a complex and thriving natural language in its own right with an independent syntax and grammar as functional and powerful as any found in the oral languages of the world. Gil Eastman, a Deaf actor and playwright, recommended that Stokoe be called the "Father of Sign Language linguistics."

Notes

References
 
 
 An interview with William C. Stokoe. Gallaudet Research Institute Newsletter, Fall 1984, pp. 3, 5.
 Gerhold, Sara C. 2000. William C. Stokoe and the Study of Signed Languages Conference. Research at Gallaudet – A publication of the Gallaudet Research Institute at Gallaudet University (Winter 2000), p. 7. (Full issue)
 Stokoe gives keynote address at linguistics conference. Research at Gallaudet (Fall 1988), pp. 4–6.
 Pearson, Richard. 2000. Linguist William C. Stokoe Jr. Dies at 80. Washington Post (April 8, 2000), p. B6.
 Nagourney, Eric. 2000. William Stokoe Jr., Sign Language Advocate, Dies at 80. New York Times (April 11, 2000), p. B10. 
 
 Neisser, Arden. 1984. Listening to the Deaf. Cornell Alumni News (July 1984), pp. 14–18.

External links
 Gupress.gallaudet.edu
 Gupress.gallaudet.edu
 Gupress.gallaudet.edu

1919 births
2000 deaths
Linguists from the United States
Literary critics of English
Deaf culture in the United States
People involved with sign language
Linguists of sign languages
Writers from New Hampshire
Wells College people
Gallaudet University faculty
20th-century linguists